Ås IF is a Swedish football club located in Ås near Östersund.

Background
Ås IF currently plays in Division 4 Jämtland/Härjedalen which is the sixth tier of Swedish football. They play their home matches at the Hovängen in Ås.

The club is affiliated to Jämtland-Härjedalens Fotbollförbund.

Season to season

Footnotes

External links
 Ås IF – Official website
 Ås IF on Facebook

Sport in Jämtland County
Football clubs in Jämtland County
1924 establishments in Sweden